Pleosphaerulina sojicola (formerly known as Pringheima sojicala) is a plant pathogen commonly causing spotted decolouration on the leafs of soybeans.

References

External links 
 Index Fungorum
 USDA ARS Fungal Database

Fungal plant pathogens and diseases
Peanut diseases
Dothideales
Fungi described in 1921